Calcium glycerylphosphate (or calcium glycerophosphate) is a mineral supplement. Formerly it was sold as a nerve tonic. It is added to some kinds of toothpaste.

References

Calcium compounds
Organophosphates